The Winterset Community School District (Winterset Community Schools or Winterset Schools), is a 
rural public school district headquartered in Winterset, Iowa.

The district is completely within Madison County.  The district serves Winterset and the surrounding rural areas, including the towns of East Peru and Patterson.

Justin Gross was hired as superintendent in 2020, after serving as Associate Superintendent of School Improvement at Nevada.

The school mascot is the Huskies, and their colors are black and gold.

Schools
The district operates four schools, all in Winterset:
 Winterset Elementary School
 Winterset Middle School
 Winterset Junior High School
 Winterset Senior High School

Winterset High School

Athletics 
The Huskies compete in the Raccoon River Conference in the following sports:

Fall Sports
Cross Country (boys and girls)
 Boys' 1960 Class A State Champions
Swimming (girls)
Volleyball (girls)
Football

Winter Sports
Basketball (boys and girls)
Wrestling 
 1994 Class 2A State Duals Champions< 
Swimming (boys)

Spring Sports
Track and Field (boys and girls)
 Boys' - 2-time Class A State Champions (1963, 1967)
Golf (boys and girls)
Tennis (boys and girls)
Soccer (girls)

Summer Sports
Baseball
Softball
 Class 3A State Champions (2008)
 3-time Class 4A State Champions (2017, 2020, 2022)

See also
List of school districts in Iowa
List of high schools in Iowa

References

External links
 Winterset Community School District

School districts in Iowa
Education in Madison County, Iowa